The Sieg automatic rifle was a bullpup automatic rifle designed by Chief Gunner's Mate James E. Sieg of the US Coast Guard. The weapon was chambered in the .30-06 round, fed from 20 round magazines and capable of firing around 650–700 RPM on full automatic.  A two-finger double trigger selected between semiautomatic and fully automatic fire. The barrel came with a unique muzzle compensator that could be turned off for use with a flash hider or grenade launcher without interfering with the installation of a bayonet. Recoil gently threw the barrel of the Sieg rifle downward, not upward. When tested at Fort Benning, it had effective results. The compensator was extremely effective; it also enabled the user to fire the rifle with one hand.

Sieg obtained a patent for his compensator in 1948, as USPTO 2451514.

See also
Model 45A
List of bullpup firearms
List of battle rifles

References

External links
 Lock, Stock, and History

.30-06 Springfield battle rifles
.30-06 Springfield machine guns
Bullpup rifles
Gas-operated firearms
Light machine guns
Trial and research firearms of the United States